Podlesny is a rural locality (a khutor) in Itkulovsky Selsoviet, Ishimbaysky District, Bashkortostan, Russia. The population was 10 as of 2010. There is 1 street.

Geography 
Podlesny is located 31 km southeast of Ishimbay (the district's administrative centre) by road. Avangard is the nearest rural locality.

References 

Rural localities in Ishimbaysky District